The 2016 New York State Assembly 65th district special election was held on April 19, 2016. Democratic nominee Alice Cancel defeated Working Families nominee Yuh-Line Niou, Republican nominee Lester Chang, and Green nominee Dennis Levy to succeed Representative Sheldon Silver in the New York State Assembly from the 65th district.

Silver had served in the state assembly since 1976, and as Speaker since 1994, but he resigned and was convicted for a corruption scandal. Cancel won the Democratic nomination although Niou and Jenifer Rajkumar accused the process of being undemocratic. Chang received the nominations of the Republican, Independence, Reform, and Clean Up The Mess parties while Levy received the Green nomination.

Niou ran in the special election with the Working Families nomination, but Cancel won in the election. Niou later defeated Cancel in the 2016 primary and Rajkumar was elected to the state assembly after the 2020 election.

Background

Representative Sheldon Silver was first elected to the New York State Assembly in the 1976 election and was selected to serve as Speaker in 1994. Silver resigned from the speakership and state assembly and was later convicted in a $5 million corruption case. Governor Andrew Cuomo called a special election for the seat alongside special elections for the 59th and 62nd assembly districts and the 9th Senate district.

Campaign

Candidates

Democratic

The candidate was selected by 185 County Committee members using weighed votes. Yuh-Line Niou announced at the end of her five-minute speech at the selection meeting that she was dropping out stating that the nomination process was flawed. Alice Cancel defeated Paul Newell, Jenifer Rajkumar, Niou, and Gigi Li for the Democratic nomination. Rajkumar also stated that the selection process was undemocratic.

Other

Newell declined the nomination of the Independence Party of New York. Dennis Levy, the president of the New York State Committee to Legalize Marijuana, ran with the nomination of the Green Party. Lester Chang appeared on the ballot with the nominations of the Republican, Independence, Reform, and Clean Up The Mess parties.

Results and aftermath

The Lo-Down moderated two candidate forums during the campaign which included Cancel, Niou, Chang, and Levy. Cancel defeated Niou, Chang, and Levy in the election. During the 2016 election Niou defeated Cancel for the Democratic nomination and Niou won in the general election after defeating Republican nominee Bryan Jung, Green nominee Manny Cavaco, and Cancel who appeared on the ballot with the Women's Equality Party's nomination. Rajkumar was later elected to the state assembly from the 38th district during the 2020 election.

Results

Endorsements

References

New York State Assembly elections
Assembly District 65 special
State Assembly District 65
New York State Assembly District 65